Ayvalık is an Aegean coastal town and district of Balıkesir Province, Turkey.

Ayvalık (literally "quince orchard") is a Turkish word. It may also refer to the following places in Turkey:

 Ayvalık, Yumurtalık, a village in the district of Yumurtalık, Adana Province